"Settle" is a song by Australian singer songwriter, Vera Blue and was released on 11 March 2016. and peaked at number 79 on the Australian ARIA Chart in April 2016.

A black-and-white music video was released on 3 March 2016.

Review
Mike Wass from Idolator said the song was "dark and brooding" and "Melancholy piano propels the song along with delicate synths merely adding depth and texture."

Track listing 
Digital download

Charts

Certifications

Release history

References 

Vera Blue songs
2016 singles
2016 songs
Universal Music Australia singles
Songs written by Gossling